Jack Manly (born 19 October 2004) is an English footballer who plays as a midfielder for  club Ipswich Town.

Career
He made his debut for Ipswich Town on 10 November 2020 as a substitute in a 2–0 EFL Trophy defeat to Crawley Town, and was Ipswich's second youngest player at the age of 16 years and 22 days.

Career statistics

References

2004 births
Living people
English footballers
Association football midfielders
Ipswich Town F.C. players